Liar & a Thief is the debut album by American rapper Diabolic. It was released by Viper Records on April 6, 2010 and the album peaked on Billboard's R&B/Hip-Hop Albums chart at #76 on 24 April 2010. The album features guests such as  Immortal Technique, Ill Bill, Vinnie Paz, Deadly Hunta, Nate Augustus, and Canibus with production handled entirely by Engineer with the exception of track 3, which is produced by John Otto of Limp Bizkit on live drums. The album won 2010 HHUG Best Album of the Year award.

Track listing

Charts

References 

2010 debut albums
Diabolic (rapper) albums